William Allan Skehan (1 January 1906 – 20 April 2004) was an Australian rules footballer who played for the Carlton Football Club in the Victorian Football League (VFL).

Notes

External links 

Allan Skehan's profile at Blueseum

1906 births
Carlton Football Club players
Wangaratta Football Club players
Australian rules footballers from Victoria (Australia)
2004 deaths